Elisabeth Schroedter (born 11 March 1959 in Dresden) is a German politician who served as a Member of the European Parliament in the Alliance '90/The Greens from 1994 to 2014.

Political career 
In parliament, Schroedter served as vice-chairwoman of the Committee on Employment and Social Affairs. She was also a member of the Committee on Regional Development (1994–2007) and the Committee on Foreign Affairs (1999–2004).

Personal life 
Schroedter is married and has three sons.

References 

1959 births
Living people
Alliance 90/The Greens MEPs
MEPs for Germany 1999–2004
MEPs for Germany 2004–2009
MEPs for Germany 2009–2014
20th-century women MEPs for Germany
21st-century women MEPs for Germany
Recipients of the Cross of the Order of Merit of the Federal Republic of Germany